Rmetrics is a free, open-source and open development software project for teaching computational finance. Rmetrics is based primarily on the statistical R programming language, but does contain contributions in other programming languages, Fortran, C, and C++. The project was started in 2001 by Diethelm Wuertz, based at the Swiss Federal Institute of Technology in Zurich.

Rmetrics packages 
Most Rmetrics components are distributed as R packages, which are add-on modules for R.

Goals 
The broad goals of the projects are:
 to provide widespread access to a broad range of powerful statistical and graphical methods for the analysis of market data and risk management in finance.
 to provide a common software platform that enables the rapid development and deployment of extensible, scalable, and interoperable software.
 to strengthen the scientific understanding by producing high-quality documentation and reproducible research.
 to train researchers on computational and statistical methods for the analysis of financial data and for financial risk management.

R/Rmetrics project 
Rmetrics and the R package system provides a broad range of advantages to the Rmetrics project including:
 a high-level interpreted language in which one can easily and quickly prototype new computational methods.
 It includes a well established system for packaging together software components and documentation.
 It can address the diversity and complexity of computational finance and financial engineering problems in a common object-oriented framework.
 It supports a rich set of statistical simulation and modeling activities.
 It contains cutting edge data and model visualization capabilities.
 It has been the basis for pathbreaking research in parallel statistical computing.

Open source commitment 
The Rmetrics project has a commitment to full open source discipline, with distribution via a SourceForge.net-like platform. All software contributions are expected to exist under an open source license such as GPL2, Artistic 2.0, or BSD. There are many different reasons why open—source software is beneficial to a software project in finance. The reasons include:
 To provide full access to algorithms and their implementation 

 To facilitate software improvements through bug fixing and software extension

 To encourage good scientific computing and statistical practice by providing appropriate tools and instruction
 To provide a workbench of tools that allow researchers to explore and expand the methods used to analyze biological data

 To lead and encourage commercial support and development of those tools that are successful
 To promote reproducible research by providing open and accessible tools with which to carry out that research (reproducible research is distinct from independent verification)
 To encourage users to join the Rmetrics project, either by contributing Rmetrics compliant packages or documentation.

Rmetrics Repository 
The Rmetrics Repository is hosted by R-forge. The following developers (in alphabetical order) contribute or have contributed to the Rmetrics packages: Andrew Ellis, Christophe Dutang, David Lüthi, David Scott, Diethelm Würtz, Francesco Gochez, Juri Hinz, Marco Perlin, Martin Mächler, Maxime Debon, Petr Savicky, Philipp Erb, Pierre Chausse, Sergio Guirreri, Spencer Graves, Yohan Chalabi

Resources

See also 
 Computational finance
 R (programming language)

External links 
 

Financial software
Free R (programming language) software
Free science software
Science software for Linux
Science software for macOS
Science software for Windows